Ixorheorida is an order within the subclass Conoidasida of the phylum Apicomplexia. All members of this order are parasitic protozoa.

Taxonomy

The order has one family — Ixorheidae. This family has one genus — Ixorheis — and this genus has a single species — Ixorheis psychropotae.

History

This species and genus were described in 1978 by Massin, Jangoux and Sibuet. The species was isolated from the digestive tract of the sea cucumber Psychropotes longicauda.

The order and family were created by Levine in 1984.

Life cycle

Gametogony is absent in this order but both merogony and sporogony occur.

References

Apicomplexa orders